Mała Słońca  is a village in the administrative district of Gmina Subkowy, within Tczew County, Pomeranian Voivodeship, in northern Poland. It is located within the ethnocultural region of Kociewie in the historic region of Pomerania.

The village has a population of 280.

Mała Słońca was a royal village of the Polish Crown, administratively located in the Tczew County in the Pomeranian Voivodeship.

References

Populated places on the Vistula
Villages in Tczew County